Winona is an unincorporated community in North Bend Township, Starke County, in the U.S. state of Indiana.

History
A post office was established at Winona in 1891, and remained in operation until it was discontinued in 1905.

References

Unincorporated communities in Starke County, Indiana
Unincorporated communities in Indiana